The 2011 Irish Classic was a professional non-ranking snooker tournament that took place between 29 and 30 October 2011 at the Celbridge Snooker Club in Kildare, Republic of Ireland. The event was sponsored by Lucan Racing.

Fergal O'Brien won in the final 5–2 against Ken Doherty, who made three century breaks (120, 107, 104) during the tournament.

Main draw

References

2011
Lucan Racing Classic
Lucan Racing Classic